The National Academy of Sciences (NAS) Building houses the executive offices of the National Academy of Sciences, National Academy of Engineering, and the National Academy of Medicine. It is located at 2101 Constitution Avenue, N.W., in Washington, D.C. Designed by Bertram Grosvenor Goodhue, the building's architecture combines elements of Classicism and irregular forms into a new “Alexandrian” style. President Calvin Coolidge gave the principal address at the building dedication ceremony on April 28, 1924, referring to the building as a "Temple of Science".

References

External links 

  at the NAS website

Neoclassical architecture in Washington, D.C.
Bertram Goodhue buildings
Buildings and structures on the National Register of Historic Places in Washington, D.C.
Buildings and structures completed in 1924
Foggy Bottom